The pouch is a distinguishing feature of female marsupials, monotremes and possibly most extinct non-placental mammals including eutherians like Zalambdalestes (and rarely in the males as in the yapok and the extinct thylacine); the name marsupial is derived from the Latin marsupium, meaning "pouch". This is due to the occurrence of epipubic bones, a pair of bones projecting forward from the pelvis. Marsupials give birth to a live but relatively undeveloped fetus called a joey. When the joey is born it crawls from inside the mother to the pouch. The pouch is a fold of skin with a single opening that covers the teats. Inside the pouch, the blind offspring attaches itself to one of the mother’s teats and remains attached for as long as it takes to grow and develop to a juvenile stage.

Variations
Pouches are different amongst different marsupials, two kinds distinguishable (on the front or belly): opening towards the head and extending the cavity under the skin towards the tail (forward, or up) or opening towards the tail and extending towards the front legs (to the rear, backward or down). For example for quolls and Tasmanian devils, the pouch opens to the rear and the joey only has to travel a short distance to get to the opening (resting place) of the pouch. While in the pouch they are permanently attached to the teat and once the young have developed they leave the pouch. The kangaroo's pouch opens horizontally on the front of the body, and the joey must climb a relatively long way to reach it. Kangaroos and wallabies allow their young to live in the pouch well after they are physically capable of leaving, often keeping two joeys in the pouch, one tiny and one fully developed. In kangaroos, wallabies and opossums, the pouch opens forward or up.  

Female koalas have been described as having a ‘backward-opening’ pouch like wombats, as opposed to an upward-opening pouch like kangaroos, but that is not true. When a female Koala gives birth to young her pouch opening faces neither up nor down, although it is located towards the bottom of the pouch rather than at the top. It faces straight outwards rather than ‘backwards’. It sometimes appears to be ‘backward-facing’ because when the joey is older and leans out of the pouch, this pulls the pouch downwards or ‘backwards’. The pouch has a strong sphincter muscle at the opening to prevent the joey from falling out. 

In wombats and marsupial moles, the pouch opens backward or down. Backwards facing pouches would not work well in kangaroos or opossums as their young would readily fall out.  Similarly, forward-facing pouches would not work well for wombats and marsupial moles as they both dig extensively underground.  Their pouches would fill up with dirt and suffocate the developing young. Kangaroo mothers will lick their pouches clean before the joey crawls inside. Kangaroo pouches are sticky to support their young joey. Koalas are unable to clean out their pouches since they face backwards, so just prior to giving birth to the young koala joey, a self-cleaning system is activated, secreting droplets of an anti-microbial liquid that cleans it out. In a relatively short time, the cleansing droplets clean out all of the crusty material left inside, leaving an almost sterile nursery ready to receive the tiny joey. 

Some marsupials (e.g. phascogales) lack the true, permanent pouches seen in other species.  Instead, they form temporary skin folds (sometimes called "pseudo-pouches") in the mammary region when reproducing. This type of pouch also occurs in echidnas which are monotremes.

Pouches have their own microbiota and it changes depending on reproductive stage: anoestrus, pre-oestrus, oestrus/birth, post-birth.

See also
For more about the nature and usage of the pouch, see

References

External links
 

Marsupial anatomy